Kiril Erokhin (born 22 March 1993, Moscow, Russia) is a Russian football defender who plays for FC Dacia Chișinău.

Club statistics
Total matches played in Moldavian First League: 30 matches - 1 goals

References

External links

Profile at Divizia Nationala
Profile at FC Dacia Chișinău

1993 births
Footballers from Moscow
Moldovan footballers
Living people
Association football defenders
FC Dacia Chișinău players
FC Zimbru Chișinău players
FC Sfîntul Gheorghe players